The 9th Parliament of Solomon Islands, determined by the 2010 general election, was the National Parliament of Solomon Islands from 2010 until 2014.  It was preceded by the eighth and followed by the tenth.

The 9th Parliament consisted in 50 representatives, elected from 50 single-seat constituencies.

Party standings
The various parties had the following number of seats. The Speaker is chosen from outside Parliament.

Members
The following were the 50 members of the 9th Parliament.

Of these, only seven had been in Parliament prior to 2006. Job Tausinga is Parliament's veteran, having been continuously elected since 1984. Danny Philip was first elected in 1984, but lost his seat in 2001, before regaining it in 2010. Walter Folotalu was first elected in 1994, lost his seat in 1997, and returned to Parliament in a by-election in 2008. Manasseh Sogavare and Snyder Rini have both continuously been elected since 1997. Gordon Darcy Lilo is serving his third consecutive term, having first been elected in 2001. And James Tora first entered Parliament in a by-election in 2004. Twenty other MPs (including the now deceased Toswel Kaua) are serving their second term, while the other twenty-three (including the now deceased Steve Laore, and disgraced Jimmy Lusibaea) are first time MPs.

From among these MPs, Prime Minister Danny Philip appointed his Cabinet on 27 August, while Opposition Leader Steve Abana appointed his Shadow Cabinet on 31 August. Additionally, Clay Forau was elected Leader of the Independent Members of Parliament.

Changes

 Steve Laore (Independent), MP for Shortlands, died on 25 August 2010, three weeks after the election. There was a by-election in Shortlands to determine his successor, on 30 March 2011. His brother Christopher Laore (Independent) succeeded him.
 Toswel Kaua (Independent), MP for Baegu-Asifola, died on 16 November 2010. There was a by-election in Baegu-Asifola to determine his successor, on 30 March 2011. David Tome (Independent) succeeded him.
 Jimmy Lusibaea (Independent), MP for North Malaita and Minister for Fisheries, lost his seat on 30 November 2010 upon being sentenced to two years and nine months in gaol for assault and grievous bodily harm. On 20 January 2011, the Minister for Police, James Tora, remitted Lusibaea's sentence to one month, using his discretion as Minister under section 38 of the Correctional Service Act. Consequently, Lusibaea was no longer barred from occupying his seat, and resumed his functions in Parliament. On 17 October, the High Court ruled that the remit did not amount to a court-sanctioned reduction in sentence, and Lusibaea lost his seat once more. There was a by-election in North Malaita on 1 August 2012 to determine his successor. His wife Vika Lusibaea (Independent) succeeded him, becoming only the second woman ever to be elected to Parliament (following Hilda Kari in the 1990s).
 Andrew Hanaria (People's Congress Party), MP for East ꞌAreꞌare and Minister for Civil Aviation, had his election voided by the High Court on 7 December 2011. He was found to have bribed voters in his constituency with cash and material goods before the election. There was a by-election in East ꞌAreꞌare on 1 August 2012 to determine his successor. Andrew Manepora'a (party not specified) succeeded him.
 Mark Kemakeza (Independent), MP for Nggella, lost his seat in March 2012 upon being convicted of misuse of public funds and sentenced to fourteen months in gaol. A by-election was held on 27 February 2013 to determine his successor; trade unionist and teacher Johnley Hatimoana was elected to replace him.
 Johnley Hatimoana, MP for Ngella, died suddenly of pneumonia on 18 April 2014. There was no by-election, as the next general election was only a few months away.
 Martin Magga (People's Alliance), MP for Temotu Pele, died after a long illness on 25 August 2014. As with Johnley Hatimoana, his death did not necessitate a by-election.

Legislation
The following Acts were enacted under the Ninth Parliament.

 2010 Supplementary Appropriation Act 2011 
 2011 Appropriation Act 2011

See also
 8th Parliament of Solomon Islands
 10th Parliament of Solomon Islands

References

Politics of the Solomon Islands
Government of the Solomon Islands
2010 establishments in the Solomon Islands
National Parliament of the Solomon Islands